MS  Adriana was a mid-sized cruise ship with old fashion interior in French style, currently owned and operated by Adriana Shipping. She sailed the Caribbean Sea under flag of Saint Kitts and Nevis from Port of Spain for Adriana Cruises in 2015.

Ship history
The ship was built for Hellenic Mediterranean Lines (HML) as Aquarius in 1972. She was the first HML cruise ship, and also the first cruise ship purpose-built in Greece.
Aquarius was ordered and laid down at United Shipping Yard in Perama as yard number 54. She was launched on 15 September 1971 and commissioned in June 1972.  
The vessel was 4591 gross tons, 103,71 metres long and could carry 312 passengers.
  
In 1987, after a poor season following the Achille Lauro hijacking, Aquarius was sold to Yugoslav Jadranska Linijska Plovidba in Rijeka and renamed Adriana. The ship ran cruises for Jadrolinija  in the Adriatic and charters to other cruise companies such as HAPAG. 
In 1997 she was sold to Marina Cruises and passed to Nice-based Plein Cap, care of Marina Cruises. 
Between April 2008 and September 2010, the ship was sold to Tapas and sailed as Adriana III.
Since September 2010, Adriana sailed under the flag of Saint Kitts and Nevis with (mainly) Russian crew under the command of ship owner, captain Sergey Ponyatovsky, for Tropicana in the Caribbean Sea from Havana in 2011 and 2012, for Black & Baltic Seas Cruise Company (B&BS) in the Black Sea from Odessa in 2013 and Sochi in 2014, chartered by West Indies Cruise Line for cruises from Port of Spain in 2015.

As of January 2023, she has been completely scrapped.

References

External links

Adriana Cruises

Cruise ships
Ships built in Greece
1971 ships